Forging Ahead is a 1933 British comedy mystery film directed by Norman Walker and starring Margot Grahame, Garry Marsh and Anthony Holles. Its plot involves a gang of criminals who pretend a house is haunted in order to keep people away.

It was made at Wembley Studios as a quota quickie.

Cast
 Margot Grahame as Crystal Grey 
 Garry Marsh as Honorable Horace Slimminger 
 Anthony Holles as Percival Custard 
 Clifford Heatherley as Professor Bowe 
 Clifford Makeham as Abraham Lombard 
 Melville Cooper as Smedley 
 Edgar Norfolk as Lieutenant-Colonel Fair 
 Edith Saville as Lady Leverton

References

Bibliography
 Chibnall, Steve. Quota Quickies: The Birth of the British 'B' Film. British Film Institute, 2007.
 Low, Rachael. Filmmaking in 1930s Britain. George Allen & Unwin, 1985.
 Wood, Linda. British Films, 1927-1939. British Film Institute, 1986.

External links

1933 films
1930s English-language films
Films directed by Norman Walker
Films shot at Wembley Studios
Quota quickies
British black-and-white films
British comedy mystery films
1930s comedy mystery films
1933 comedy films
1930s British films